Constantin Viorel Gărgălie (born 20 May 1979) is a Romanian former professional footballer who played as a right-back.

External links
 
 

1979 births
Living people
Romanian footballers
Association football fullbacks
FC Drobeta-Turnu Severin players
FC U Craiova 1948 players